The Committee of Interns and Residents (CIR) is the largest housestaff union in the United States, representing more than 24,000  interns, residents, and fellows in California, Florida, Illinois, Massachusetts, New Jersey, New York, New Mexico, Washington, Washington, D.C., and Vermont.  CIR contracts seek to improve housestaff salaries and working conditions as well as enhance the quality of patient care. CIR was founded in 1957.

History 

CIR was founded by interns and residents in New York City's public hospitals. In 1958, CIR achieved the first collective bargaining agreement for housestaff anywhere in the U.S. By the mid-1960s, CIR had established the only housestaff-administered benefit plan. By 1969-70, members in the private, or voluntary, sector started organizing and joining CIR.

In a landmark achievement in 1975, CIR won contractual limits for on-call schedules of one night in three. In the late 1980s and early 1990s, CIR successfully negotiated innovative maternity leave clauses, won provisions for pay for housestaff covering for absent colleagues, and in 1989 helped shape New York State's regulations that set maximum work hour limits for housestaff. Since then, CIR members have negotiated hours limitations and program security clauses in Miami, Los Angeles, and Boston.

In May 1997, CIR affiliated with the 1.6 million-member Service Employees International Union (SEIU), which represents over 1 million healthcare workers nationwide. Its affiliation with SEIU has increased its strength wherever CIR represents housestaff.

Mission 
According to its website, CIR's mission is to be "the national voice for physicians-in-training, uniting and empowering them to create a better and more just healthcare system for patients and healthcare workers and to improve training and quality of life for resident physicians, fellows, and their families."

References

Further reading
 Ludmerer, Kenneth M. Time to heal: American medical education from the turn of the century to the era of managed care. Oxford University Press, 1999.
 Mullan, Fitzhugh. White Coat, Clenched Fist: The Political Education of an American Physician. University of Michigan Press, 2006.
 Peterkin, Allen. Staying human during residency training: how to survive and thrive after medical school. University of Toronto Press, 2008.
 Institute of Medicine (U.S.). Committee on Optimizing Graduate Medical Trainee (Resident) Hours and Work Schedules to Improve Patient Safety. Resident duty hours: enhancing sleep, supervision, and safety (Google eBook).

Healthcare trade unions in the United States
Medical and health student organizations
Service Employees International Union
Medical and health organizations based in New York (state)
Trade unions established in 1957